Mexicana Universal Sinaloa is a pageant in Sinaloa, Mexico, that selects that state's representative for the national Mexicana Universal.

Sinaloa is the third State in Mexico that has produced more crowns in the history with 5 crowns. The State Organization has produced three Nuestra Belleza México in 2003 with Rosalva Luna, 2006 with Rosa María Ojeda and 2017 with Denisse Franco,    two Nuestra Belleza Mundo México in 2000 with Paulina Flores and 2008 with Perla Beltrán and two Nuestra Belleza Internacional México in 1999 with Lynette Deldago and 2008 with Laura Zúñiga, but these crowns are not taken into account because later Lynette resigned and Laura was dethroned.

Titleholders
Below are the names of the annual titleholders of Mexicana Universal Sinaloa, listed in ascending order, and their final placements in the Mexicana Universal after their participation, until 2017 the names was Nuestra Belleza Sinaloa.

 Competed in Miss Universe.
 Competed in Miss World.
 Competed in Miss International.
 Competed in Miss Charm International.
 Competed in Miss Continente Americano.
 Competed in Reina Hispanoamericana.
 Competed in Miss Orb International.
 Competed in Nuestra Latinoamericana Universal.

Designated Contestants
As of 2000, isn't uncommon for some States to have more than one delegate competing simultaneously in the national pageant. The following Nuestra Belleza Sinaloa contestants were invited to compete in Nuestra Belleza México. Some have placed higher than the actual State winners.

External links
Official Website

Nuestra Belleza México